Christophe Gbenye ( 1927 – 3 February 2015) was a Congolese politician, trade unionist, and rebel who, along with Gaston Soumialot, led the Simba rebellion, an anti-government insurrection in the Democratic Republic of the Congo during the Congo Crisis, between 1964 and 1965.

Biography 
Christophe Gbenye was born in Bas-Uélé District, Orientale Province in the Belgian Congo in 1927 as a member of the Mbua tribe. Relatively little is known about his early life. He served as a clerk for the Stanleyville municipal government's finance department and became a trade unionist. He later served as the vice president of the eastern Congo branch of the General Labour Federation of Belgium which in 1951 became the Confederation of Free Trade Unions of the Congo.

Gbenye joined Patrice Lumumba's independence oriented Mouvement National Congolais (MNC-L) in the late 1950s, and became a prominent leader of the party by 1959. Lumumba appointed him minister of the interior in the first Congolese parliament in 1960 following independence. In September, President Joseph Kasa-Vubu dismissed Lumumba from his position as prime minister. Gbenye was also dismissed, and he retired to Stanleyville where he enjoyed political support. Lumumba's eventual arrest and execution in January 1961 deeply angered Gbenye, though he did briefly return to his position as interior minister under Cyrille Adoula's coalition government. He replaced Lumumba as president of the MNC-L. However, Gbenye was seen as a political liability by the United States Central Intelligence Agency, which was largely responsible for Adoula's rise to power. Adoula then dismissed Gbenye, ostensibly because of his political rivalry with Victor Nendaka Bika, though Gbenye remained in parliament through early 1962. He then briefly returned to eastern Congo, then under the control of Antoine Gizenga's rebel government.

In September 1963 he relocated to Brazzaville in the neighbouring Republic of the Congo. On 3 October, Gbenye, Bocheley Davidson, Gaston Soumialot, and other dissidents established the revolutionary organization Comité National de Libération. Assistance was sought from the Soviet Union in the form of equipment and training. In 1964, under the leadership of Gbenye, Mulele and Soumialot, much of the eastern Congo was overrun by young rebel fighters who called themselves simbas (lions). Gbenye served as President of the rebel state, the People's Republic of the Congo (République populaire du Congo), established by the rebels in Stanleyville (modern Kisangani). By late 1965 the rebellion had been suppressed by the Congo's central government, under the tacit control of Joseph-Désiré Mobutu, and Gbenye and others soon fled the country.

From 1966 to 1971 Gbenye lived in exile in Uganda. He returned to county after the amnesty in 1971.

In 2010 the then 83-year-old Gbenye was living in retirement in Kinshasa. He died on 3 February 2015.

See also 
Gold Scandal (1965)

References 

Year of birth missing
1920s births
2015 deaths
People from Bas-Uélé
Democratic Republic of the Congo rebels
People of the Congo Crisis
Mouvement National Congolais politicians
Government ministers of the Democratic Republic of the Congo
Democratic Republic of the Congo exiles
Lumumba Government members
Deputy Prime Ministers of the Democratic Republic of the Congo
Democratic Republic of the Congo expatriates in Uganda
21st-century Democratic Republic of the Congo people